The Umbrella Rock is a rock found at the site of the Boti Falls in Yilo Krobo District, Ghana, and is one of the main tourist attractions in the country's Eastern Region. As the name implies, Umbrella Rock has an overhang on the top large enough to cover 12 to 15 people at once.

Yearly, many tourists travel to Boti Falls for its natural beauty, and the umbrella rock is visible through much of the trek to the falls.

References

External links
Boti Falls - Attractions

Eastern Region (Ghana)
Landforms of Ghana
Rock formations of Africa
Tourist attractions in Ghana